"Portrait of a Lackey on Fire" is the eighth episode of the thirty-third season of the American animated television series The Simpsons, and the 714th episode overall. It aired in the United States on Fox on November 21, 2021. The episode was directed by Steven Dean Moore and written by Rob LaZebnik & Johnny LaZebnik.

Plot
Homer notices Waylon Smithers' loneliness and offers to play matchmaker for him. When a jetsetting fashion designer mogul named Michael de Graaf arrives at Mr. Burns' mansion to adopt a puppy born from one of Burns' attack hounds, Homer introduces him to Smithers and the two are immediately attracted to each other. They become a couple, and Smithers is the happiest he has ever been in his life.

During a party thrown for the couple by Marge, Michael announces he is opening his new manufacturing plant in Springfield, opening multiple job positions to the town. During a tour of the factory, Homer, Bart, and Lisa discover sweatshop working conditions and the toxic waste from the factory polluting the environment.

Realizing that Michael is fully aware of this, Homer reluctantly shows Smithers the damaging effects of Michael's business. Smithers grapples with this information, asking Burns for advice, only to be told that "fast fashion" is an even more evil industry than nuclear power, and that Michael is effectively a supervillain. Burns advises Smithers to marry Michael to be set for life.

Smithers tries to plead with Michael to change his ways, but Michael has no plans of changing his business practices. Smithers is about to reluctantly accept Michael's offer to stay in the relationship whilst overlooking his flaws and forgetting his own moral compass, but after seeing Michael mistreat his doberman puppy, Smithers breaks up with him. Michael leaves on his jet, and an initially heartbroken Smithers discovers that Michael left the puppy behind. He happily adopts him, realizing that the puppy will offer him unconditional love and companionship, which is what he wanted most in a relationship. Smithers' profile pic of him with the puppy sparks a lot of interest on his dating app.

Production
The script was written by the screenwriting duo, Rob LaZebnik and his son Johnny, who is also gay. This is the first episode that Johnny has worked on, while Rob has written more than fifteen episodes of The Simpsons before the release of this episode. Johnny described his experience writing the script for The Simpsons as "spectacular and fulfilling". The role of Smithers' boyfriend Michael was also dubbed by gay actor Victor Garber.

Reception
Tony Sokol of Den of Geek gave the episode a 4.5 out of 5 stars stating, "The innuendo-laden repartee with his boss, Mr. Burns, includes some of the cleverest writing of the series. In earlier seasons, Smithers' personal life barely intruded into the office, unless you had to get past his network firewall to see his introductory screensaver. Here he is gifted with the most fashionable accessory, a fully realized episode. Highlighted episodes keep Mr. Burns young, Grampa Simpson old, and Gil Gunderson employed. Smithers' portrayal has been an evolution, slowly unthreading from the fabric of executive material. 'Portrait of a Lackey on Fire' is clever, empathic and bittersweet. It panders, but in unexpected ways which keep the humor coming regularly, but never uniformly. The episode works more as a character study than a joke-fest, but the character is ultimately Springfield, not Smithers, and Springfield is no Milwaukee."

Marcus Gibson of Bubbleblabber gave the episode a 7.5 out of 10, stating, "The comedy delivered a couple of chuckle-worthy moments to keep this relationship smooth and steady without suffering from tasteless schlock."

In its original broadcast, the episode was watched by 3.97 million viewers and was the highest-rated show on Animation Domination that night.

References

External links
 

2021 American television episodes
The Simpsons (season 33) episodes
LGBT-related animated television episodes
American LGBT-related television episodes